Hollister is a city in and the county seat of San Benito County, located in the Central Coast region of California. With a 2020 United States census population of 41,678, Hollister is one of the largest cities in the Monterey Bay Area and a member of the Association of Monterey Bay Area Governments. The city is an agricultural town known primarily for its local Blenheim apricots, olive oil, vineyards, pomegranates, and chocolate.

History

The area of modern-day Hollister was historically inhabited by the Mutsun band of the Ohlone  Native Americans. With the construction of Mission San Juan Bautista in 1797, the Ohlone were forced into the California mission system.

The town of Hollister was founded on November 19, 1868, by William Welles Hollister on the grounds of the former Mexican land-grant Rancho San Justo. At the time, Hollister was located within Monterey County, until San Benito County was formed by the California Legislature in 1874 from portions of Monterey, Merced, and Santa Cruz counties.

The city is intermittently the site of an annual motorcycle rally around July Fourth. The riot at the original 1947 event was the basis for the 1953 film The Wild One. The rally was revived in 1997 as the Hollister Independence Rally.

In 2005, the Hollister City Council discontinued their contract with the event organizers, the Hollister Independence Rally Committee, due to financial and public safety concerns. The event was canceled in 2006 due to lack of funding for security, but returned in 2007 and 2008. The format of the rally in 2007 differed markedly from previous rallies, with vendors on San Benito Street instead of motorcycles. The bikes were forced to park on side streets and a strict downtown curfew was imposed, with the entire area being locked up at 9:00 pm. This event was popular with bikers and some local establishments profited, but the city footed the bill for much of the expenses and was left liable when organizers filed bankruptcy.

The 2009–2012 rallies were canceled, but the annual rally was reinstated in 2013, and was expected to be profitable for the town. Following a biker gang shooting at the 2014 rally, Hollister mandated that bars must stop selling alcohol after midnight during the 2015 rally. The 2015 rally unexpectedly left the city with a $92,000 loss following a dispute with the promoter. In 2016, the city hired its third promoter in four years; turnout for the 2016 rally was expected to be around 40,000. The San Francisco Chronicle characterized the 2017 rally crowd as "retired, friendly, weather-worn and excruciatingly law abiding", and estimated the motorcycle attendance around 10,000. The 2018 rally was cancelled due to loss of a major sponsor and concerns about the cost of workers compensation liability. However, 2018 and 2019 both saw non-city-sanctioned "rebel rallies". The 2020 rally was cancelled due to "shelter in place" policies related to the 2019–20 coronavirus pandemic. A non-city-sanctioned rally occurred in 2021. The 2021 turnout was smaller than at the official rallies of the mid-2010s. In 2022 the city council declined to sponsor a rally amid a shortage of law enforcement officers.

Geography

Climate 
Hollister has a warm-summer Mediterranean climate (Köppen Csb) that has warmer summers than the Monterey–Salinas area but is cooler than many other inland cities in the Central Valley.

Geology
Hollister is well known among geologists because it represents one of the best examples of aseismic creep anywhere in the world. The Calaveras Fault (a branch of the San Andreas Fault system) bisects the city north and south, roughly along Locust Ave. and Powell St. The streets running east–west across the fault have significant visible offsets. The fault runs directly under several houses. Even though they are visibly contorted, the houses are still habitable as the owners have reinforced them to withstand the dislocation of their foundations.

Although there was extensive damage in the town after the 1989 Loma Prieta earthquake, and the governor of California came to visit, this was due to a slip of the San Andreas Fault proper and was not related to the aseismic creep on the Calaveras Fault. The San Andreas Fault (proper) (not to be confused with the Calaveras Fault) runs, at its closest, through San Juan Bautista to the west and through the Hollister Hills State Vehicular Recreation Area to the south.

Hollister is one of at least three California towns to claim the title of "Earthquake Capital of the World," the other two being Coalinga and Parkfield.

Hollister sits on the western foothills of the Diablo Range.

Demographics

2020 
As of the 2020 United States census, Hollister had a population of 41678. The city's racial makeup was 36.1% (15,055) white (23.0% non-Hispanic white), 4.1% (1,691) Asian American, 1.0% (428) black or African American, 0.3% (122) Pacific Islander, 2.8% (1,173) Native American, 37.5% (15,642) of other races, and 18.2% (7,567) from two or more races. 68.9% (28,727) of the population were Hispanic or Latino of any race.

2010

The 2010 United States Census reported that Hollister had a population of 34,928. The racial makeup of Hollister was 10,164 (29.1%) White, 341 (1.0%) African American, 617 (1.8%) Native American, 929 (2.7%) Asian, 63 (0.2%) Pacific Islander, 10,437 (29.9%) from other races, and 1,780 (5.1%) from two or more races. Hispanic or Latino of any race were 22,965 persons (65.7%).

The Census reported that 34,813 people (99.7% of the population) lived in households, 9 (0%) lived in non-institutionalized group quarters, and 106 (0.3%) were institutionalized.

There were 9,860 households, out of which 5,291 (53.7%) had children under the age of 18 living in them, 5,900 (59.8%) were opposite-sex married couples living together, 1,511 (15.3%) had a female householder with no husband present, 720 (7.3%) had a male householder with no wife present. There were 744 (7.5%) unmarried opposite-sex partnerships, and 55 (0.6%) same-sex married couples or partnerships. 1,324 households (13.4%) were made up of individuals, and 496 (5.0%) had someone living alone who was 65 years of age or older. The average household size was 3.53. There were 8,131 families (82.5% of all households); the average family size was 3.82.

The population was spread out, with 11,076 people (31.7%) under the age of 18, 3,545 people (10.1%) aged 18 to 24, 9,927 people (28.4%) aged 25 to 44, 7,803 people (22.3%) aged 45 to 64, and 2,577 people (7.4%) who were 65 years of age or older. The median age was 30.8 years. For every 100 females, there were 98.7 males. For every 100 females age 18 and over, there were 96.8 males.

The homeowner vacancy rate was 2.3%; the rental vacancy rate was 5.0%. 20,781 people (59.5% of the population) lived in owner-occupied housing units and 14,032 people (40.2%) lived in rental housing units.

Government

The city council consists of four council members and an elected mayor who represents the city at large.  The first directly elected mayor in the city's history, Ignacio Velazquez, was elected in November 2012.

Around early 2014, Hollister hired four additional police officers to battle a perceived increase in methamphetamine use. In addition, the early 2010s saw an increase in heroin use among young adults, possibly related to tighter regulation of prescription drugs such as Oxycontin which have similar effects to heroin. Furthermore, youth violence spiked around 2013 and 2014.

Confusion with Hollister Co.
Hollister Co. is an American lifestyle brand by Abercrombie & Fitch Co. that projects a Southern California image. According Abercrombie & Fitch, the name "Hollister" was pulled out of thin air. The city of Hollister is not affiliated with Hollister Co., and Hollister Co. does not manufacture goods or operate a store in the city of Hollister. In 2009, Abercrombie & Fitch threatened to sue local merchants in the city of Hollister for trademark infringement for attempting to sell clothes bearing the name "Hollister", prompting at least one merchant to back down.

Media

BenitoLink serves San Benito County. BenitoLink is a locally created community-based online news website. It covers all of San Benito County, which includes the two main towns of Hollister and San Juan Bautista and the many miles of open rural countryside that make up the rest of the county. In 2012, the Community Foundation for San Benito County held listening sessions with a wide variety and large number of county residents to get an idea of the population's needs and interests. The result was an clear interest in a consistent, dependable news source that people could depend on for basic facts, info on activities and a commitment to covering local government. BenitoLink was created with a Knight Foundation grant and the support of the Community Foundation for San Benito County.

As a nonprofit news site, BenitoLink is community supported much like PBS stations with individual donors, business sponsors, and major donors. It hosts forums for elections and civil dialogue about important community topics. BenitoLink has a group of reporters and photographers who make an effort to produce stories without inserting their personal opinion and giving the reader the opportunity to learn about the many things occurring in the rapidly growing county. The main focus of the reporting team is government, investigative and features that look at the unique character of the county. The BenitoLink staff refrains from publishing editorials or taking political positions and welcome stimulating conversation among residents.

Print
The Hollister Free Lance is a newspaper now published on Fridays by New SV Media.

Mission Village Voice is a monthly newspaper, which is also online, focused on San Juan Bautista and covering San Benito county events, arts and culture in general. It is owned by San Juan Bautista resident Anne Caetano, who started the paper on her own and produces a creative newspaper with local writers, designers and artists.

Television
CMAP TV - Community Media Access Partnership operates Channels 17, 18, 19 & 20 on Charter/Spectrum Cable as well as streaming online, offering public access and educational programming to Gilroy and San Benito County as well as offering live local government coverage, including the City of Hollister.

Radio
The following radio stations are licensed to Hollister:
 KMPG, at 1520 AM daytime, plays regional Mexican music;
 KHRI, at 90.7 FM, is an affiliate of Air 1 playing contemporary Christian music;
 KXSM, at 93.1 FM, broadcasts a regional Mexican format.
 K206BQ, at 89.1 FM, rebroadcasts KLVM.
 K265DG, at 100.9 FM, rebroadcasts KPRC-FM.

Infrastructure

Transportation

Highways
  runs northwestward to the San Francisco Bay Area and southeastward to Pinnacles National Park and Coalinga (the latter via State Route 198). Until 1984, Route 25 through Hollister was defined under State law as a segment of State Route 180.
  runs westward to Monterey Bay and northeastward to Los Banos in the Central Valley (via State Route 152).
 ,  to west, is the nearest major north–south interstate highway, linking the Hollister area to the rest of the Central Coast region, San Francisco to the north, and Los Angeles to the south.
  Interstate 5,  to the east, is a major north–south interstate highway, linking the Hollister area north to Sacramento and south to Los Angeles.

Public transportation
 San Benito County Express provides local service within Hollister, regional service to San Juan Bautista and Gilroy, where it connects with  Caltrain, or on-request, a "Dial-a-Ride" service, and paratransit.

Aviation
 Hollister Municipal Airport is a general aviation facility.

Healthcare
The State of California Office of Statewide Health Planning and Development defines Hazel Hawkins Memorial Hospital as a General Acute Care Hospital in Hollister with Basic emergency care as of August 22, 2006. As of 2014, the hospital has 113 beds.

Notable people 
 Brendon Clark, retired Australian bull rider, resides in Hollister.
Annie Law (1842–1889), conchologist
George H. Moore, city attorney
Charlie Root, pitcher
Stanley F. Schmidt, aerospace engineer
Mikiso Hane, professor of history at Knox College

References

External links

 

 
Cities in San Benito County, California
County seats in California
Incorporated cities and towns in California
Government of San Benito County, California
Populated places established in 1868
Populated places established in 1872
1872 establishments in California